Carol Potter may refer to:

 Carol Potter (poet), American poet and professor
 Carol Potter (actress) (born 1948), American actress